Lajos Kű (born 5 July 1948) is a Hungarian former footballer who played as a midfielder for Videoton, Ferencvárosi TC, Club Brugge  and SC Eisenstadt. In his second game for Club Brugge, he played in the 1978 European Cup Final against Liverpool.

He won a silver medal in football at the 1972 Summer Olympics, and also participated in UEFA Euro 1972 for the Hungary national team.

After having spent 15 years abroad, he returned to Hungary in the early 1990s, working as a businessman.

Honours 
Ferencváros 
 Hungarian Cup: 1971–72, 1973–74

Club Brugge European Champion Clubs' Cup: runner-up 1977–78Hungary' Olympic Games: 1972 (silver medal)

References

 Ki kicsoda a magyar sportéletben? [Who's Who in the Hungarian Sport Life], Volume II (I–R). Szekszárd: Babits Kiadó, 1995, p. 217., 
 László Rózsaligeti. Magyar olimpiai lexikon'' [Hungarian Encyclopedia of Olympics]. Budapest: Datus, 2000. 

1948 births
Living people
Association football midfielders
Hungarian footballers
Hungary international footballers
SC Eisenstadt players
Belgian Pro League players
Ferencvárosi TC footballers
Club Brugge KV players
UEFA Euro 1972 players
Olympic footballers of Hungary
Footballers at the 1972 Summer Olympics
Olympic silver medalists for Hungary
Olympic medalists in football
Medalists at the 1972 Summer Olympics
Hungarian expatriate footballers
Expatriate footballers in Austria
Hungarian expatriate sportspeople in Austria
Expatriate footballers in Belgium
Hungarian expatriate sportspeople in Belgium
People from Székesfehérvár
Volán FC players